Anderson K. Mazoka (22 March 1943 – 24 May 2006) was a Zambian politician and President of the United Party for National Development (UPND), the current  ruling party.

Life 
Mazoka was born in Monze. He attended Union College, where he graduated in 1969 with a degree in mechanical engineering. For his senior thesis, Mazoka designed and built a wind tunnel in 10 weeks. The tunnel, whose construction attracted attention from the media, filled the basement of the college's Science and Engineering department and would be used for three decades.

In the presidential election held on 27 December 2001, he finished second behind Levy Mwanawasa of the ruling Movement for Multiparty Democracy (MMD) party, winning 27.2% of the vote.

On 24 May 2006, Mazoka died from kidney complications in Johannesburg, South Africa. He was 63 years old. He was succeeded as leader of the UPND by Hakainde Hichilema.

He was married to Mutinta and had three children with her: Mutinta, Pasina and Anderson Jr. His eldest daughter Macenje was from his first marriage to Zenobia Lewis.

References

External links
Photograph

1943 births
2006 deaths
People from Monze District
United Party for National Development politicians
Deaths from kidney failure
Union College (New York) alumni